El Monte station is a train station on Metrolink's San Bernardino Line in El Monte, California. It is at 10925 Railroad Street between Santa Anita and Tyler Avenues north of Valley Boulevard. It has 238 parking spaces. The station is owned by the City of El Monte.

Connections  
The station is located directly across Railroad Street from the El Monte Trolley Station, the hub for the city's El Monte Transit system. Each of the agencies five color-coded routes (Blue, Green, Orange, Red, Yellow) stop at the Trolley Station every day of the week. In addition, the city also operates two commuter shuttles to the Civic Center and Flair Park on weekdays.

In addition, other regional bus operators stop near the station. Foothill Transit route  and Los Angeles Metro Bus routes  and  stop on Santa Anita Ave to the west of the station, while Los Angeles Metro Bus route  stops on Tyler Avenue to the east of the station.

References

External links 
 

Metrolink stations in Los Angeles County, California
El Monte, California
Railway stations in the United States opened in 1992